The Sericu is a right tributary of the river Glavacioc in Romania. It discharges into the Glavacioc in Videle. It flows through the towns and villages Siliștea Mică, Ciuperceni, Cosmești, Sericu and Videle.

References

Rivers of Romania
Rivers of Teleorman County